Sunmin Image Pictures Co., Ltd. (선민동화, Seonmin Donghwa; abbreviated as SMIP Co., Ltd.) is a South Korean animation studio. It was founded as Artplus in 1990. The studio animates many American animated television series and movies, most notably 101 Dalmatians: The Series for ABC and Ben 10 franchise (both original and reboot) for Cartoon Network.

Shows

References

South Korean animation studios
Mass media companies established in 1990
South Korean companies established in 1990